Micro (Greek letter μ (U+03BC) or the legacy symbol µ (U+00B5)) is a unit prefix in the metric system denoting a factor of 10−6 (one millionth). Confirmed in 1960, the prefix comes from the Greek , meaning "small".

The symbol for the prefix is the Greek letter μ (mu). It is the only SI prefix which uses a character not from the Latin alphabet. "mc" is commonly used as a prefix when the character "μ" is not available; for example, "mcg" commonly denotes a microgram. This may be ambiguous in rare circumstances in that mcg could also be read as a micrigram, i.e. 10−14 g; however the prefix micri is not standard, nor widely known, and is considered obsolete. The letter u, instead of μ, was allowed by an ISO document, but that document has been withdrawn in 2001, however DIN 66030:2002 still allows this substitution.

Examples
 Typical bacteria are 1 to 10 micrometres (1–10 µm) in diameter. 
 Eukaryotic cells are typically 10 to 100 micrometres in diameter.

Symbol encoding in character sets
The official symbol for the SI prefix micro is a Greek lowercase mu (μ). For reasons stemming from its design, Unicode has two different character codes for the letter, with slightly different appearance in some fonts, although most fonts use the same glyph. The micro sign (µ) is encoded in the "Latin-1 Supplement" range identical to ISO/IEC 8859-1 (since 1987), at U+00B5, residing at this code point also in DEC MCS (since 1983) and ECMA-94 (since 1985). The Greek letter (μ) is encoded in the Greek range at U+03BC. According to The Unicode Consortium, the Greek letter character is preferred, but implementations must recognize the micro sign as well. This distinction also occurs in some legacy code pages, notably Windows-1253.

In circumstances in which only the Latin alphabet is available, ISO 2955 (1974, 1983), DIN 66030 (Vornorm 1973; 1980, 2002) and BS 6430 (1983) allow the prefix μ to be substituted by the letter u (or even U, if lowercase letters are not available), as, for example, in um for μm, or uF for μF, or in the common abbreviation UC for microcontroller (µC).
Similar, capacitor values according to the RKM code defined in IEC 60062 (IEC 62) (since 1952), EN 60062, DIN 40825 (1973), BS 1852 (1974), IS 8186 (1976) etc. can be written as 4u7 (or 4U7) instead of 4μ7 if the Greek letter μ is not available.

Other abbreviating conventions
In some health care institutions, house rules deprecate the standard symbol for microgram, "μg", in prescribing or chart recording, because of the risk of giving an incorrect dose because of the misreading of poor handwriting. The two alternatives are to abbreviate as "mcg" or to write out "microgram" in full (see also List of abbreviations used in medical prescriptions). But this deprecation, focused on avoiding incorrect dosing in contexts where handwriting is often present, does not extend to all health-care contexts and institutions (for example, some clinical laboratories' reports adhere to it, whereas others do not), and in physical sciences academia, "μg" remains the sole official abbreviation.

In medical data exchange according to the Health Level 7 (HL7) standard, the μ can be replaced by u as well.

See also
 Microgram
 Microscope
 Microsecond
 Microwave
 Square micrometre
 List of commonly used taxonomic affixes

References

SI prefixes